Luciopimelodus pati is a South American species of freshwater long-whiskered catfish that inhabits the basin of the Río de la Plata and the Blanco River of Argentina, Brazil and Paraguay. Its scientific name originates from its common name patí, though it may be simply referred to as pez gato ("catfish") in Spanish.  This species is the only recognized species in its genus.

It is found mostly in turbid and deep waters with moderate current. This fish can reach up to  TL. This fish is sparingly seen as an aquarium fish.

References

External links
 Luciopimelodus pati morphology (images) at the Center for Systematic Biology and Evolution, Academy of Natural Sciences.
 Pictures and information on PlanetCatfish.com.
 Luciopimelodus pati - Summary, picture and common names in several languages.

Pimelodidae
Monotypic freshwater fish genera
Catfish genera
Taxa named by Carl H. Eigenmann
Taxa named by Rosa Smith Eigenmann
Freshwater fish of Argentina
Fish of South America
Fish of Brazil
Fish of Paraguay